Mary Jemison (Deh-he-wä-nis) (1743 – September 19, 1833) was a Scots-Irish colonial frontierswoman in Pennsylvania and New York, who became known as the "White Woman of the Genesee." As a young girl she was captured and adopted into a Seneca family, assimilating to their culture, marrying two Native American men in succession, and having children with them. In 1824 she published a memoir of her life, a form of captivity narrative.

During the French and Indian War, in spring 1755, Jemison at age 12 was captured with most of her family in a Shawnee raid in what is now Adams County, Pennsylvania.  The others of her family were killed. She and an unrelated young boy were adopted by Seneca families. She became fully assimilated, marrying a Delaware (Lenape), and, after his death, a Seneca man. She chose to remain a Seneca rather than return to American colonial culture. 

Jemison told her story late in life to an American minister, who wrote it for her. He published it as Narrative of the Life of Mrs. Mary Jemison (1824). It was reprinted in the late 20th century. In 1874 her remains were reinterred near a historic Seneca council house on a private estate, in what is now Letchworth State Park.

Biography 

Mary Jemison was born to Thomas and Jane Jemison aboard the ship William and Mary in the fall of 1743, while en route from British Ireland (in today's Northern Ireland) to America. They landed in Philadelphia, Pennsylvania, and joined other Protestant Scots-Irish immigrants in heading west to settle on cheaper available lands in the backcountry, what was then the western frontier (now central Pennsylvania). They "squatted" on territory that had been purchased by the Penn family in 1736 from chiefs of the Iroquois Confederacy, six nations that were based in central and western New York.

The Jemisons had cleared land to develop their farm, and the couple had several children. By 1755, conflicts had started in the French and Indian War, the North American front of the Seven Years' War between France and Britain. Both sides made use of Native American allies, especially in the frontier areas where they had few regular forces. One morning in early 1755, a raiding party consisting of six Shawnee Indians and four Frenchmen captured Mary, the rest of her family (except two older brothers), and a young boy from another family. En route to French-controlled Fort Duquesne (present-day Pittsburgh), the Shawnee killed Mary's mother, father, and siblings, and ritually scalped them.

Mary later learned that it was a Seneca custom, when one of their own was killed or taken prisoner in battle, to take an enemy as prisoner or to take their scalp in a mourning ritual. Two Seneca women had lost a brother in the French and Indian War a year before Mary's capture, and in this mourning raid, the Shawnee intended to capture a prisoner or obtain an enemy's scalp to compensate them. The 12-year-old Mary and the young boy were spared, likely because they were of suitable age for adoption. Once the party reached Fort Duquesne, Mary was given to the two Seneca women, who took her downriver to their settlement. After a short ceremony, a Seneca family adopted Mary, renaming her as Deh-he-wä-nis (other romanization variants include: Dehgewanus, Dehgewanus and Degiwanus, Dickewamis). She learned this meant "a pretty girl, a handsome girl, or a pleasant, good thing."

When she came of age, Mary married a Delaware man named Sheninjee, who was living with the band. They had a son whom she named Thomas after her father. Sheninjee took her on a  journey to the Sehgahunda Valley along the Genesee River in present-day Western New York state. Although Jemison and their son reached this destination, her husband did not. While hunting one day on their journey, he was taken ill and died.

As a widow, Mary and her child were taken in by Sheninjee's clan relatives; she made her home at Little Beard's Town (where present-day Cuylerville, New York later developed). She married again, to a Seneca named Hiakatoo, and together they had six children: Nancy, Polly, Betsey, Jane, John, and Jesse. John had a troubled life. He killed his brother Thomas in 1811, then killed his brother Jesse in 1812, and was later also killed. 

During the American Revolutionary War, the Seneca allied with the British, hoping that a British victory would enable them to expel the encroaching colonists. Jemison's account of her life includes observations of this time. She and others in the Seneca town helped supply Joseph Brant (Mohawk) and his Iroquois warriors from various nations, who fought the rebel colonists.

After the war, the British ceded their holdings east of the Mississippi River to the United States, without consulting their Native American allies. The Seneca were forced to give up their lands to the United States. In 1797 the Seneca sold much of their land at Little Beard's Town to Americans. At that time, during negotiations with the Holland Land Company held at Geneseo, New York, Mary Jemison proved to be an able negotiator for the Seneca tribe. She helped win more favorable terms for surrendering their rights to the land at the Treaty of Big Tree (1797).

Late in life, Jemison told her story to the minister James E. Seaver, who published it as Narrative of the Life of Mrs. Mary Jemison (1824; latest ed. 1967). It is considered a classic captivity narrative. Although some early readers thought that Seaver must have imposed his own beliefs, since the late 20th century, many history scholars have thought the memoir is a reasonably accurate account of Jemison's life story and attitude. When she was given her liberty, she decided to stay with the Senecas, because her eldest, warrior son was not allowed to go with her and, mostly, she feared her relatives "... would despise [my Indian children] if not myself; and treat us as enemies; or, at least with a degree of cold indifference, which I though I could not endure."

In 1823, the Seneca sold most of their remaining land in that area, except for a  tract of land reserved for Jemison's use. Known by local European-American residents as the "White Woman of the Genesee", Jemison lived on the tract for several years. In 1831 she sold it and moved to the Buffalo Creek Reservation, where some Seneca lived (others had gone to Ontario, Canada). Jemison died on September 19, 1833, aged 90.  She was initially buried on the Buffalo Creek Reservation. Jemison's heirs later changed their surname to "Jimerson" and established the community of Jimersontown on the Allegany Indian Reservation.

Mary's account of her capture 
"The party that took us consisted of six Indians and four Frenchmen, who immediately commenced plundering, as I just observed, and took what they considered most valuable; consisting principally of bread, meal, and meat. Having taken as much provision as they could carry, they set out with their prisoners in great haste, for fear of detection, and soon entered the woods.

On our march that day, an Indian went behind us with a whip, with which he frequently lashed the children, to make them keep up. In this manner we traveled till dark, without a mouthful of food or a drop of water, although we had not eaten since the night before. Whenever the little children cried for water, the Indians would make them drink urine, or go thirsty. At night they encamped in the woods, without fire and without shelter, where we were watched with the greatest vigilance. Extremely fatigued, and very hungry, we were compelled to lie upon the ground, without supper or a drop of water to satisfy the cravings of our appetites. As in the daytime, so the little ones were made to drink urine in the night, if they cried for water. Fatigue alone brought us a little sleep for the refreshment of our weary limbs; and at the dawn of day we were again started on our march, in the same order that we had proceeded the day before.

About sunrise we were halted, and the Indians gave us a full breakfast of provision that they had brought from my father's house. Each of us, being very hungry, partook of this bounty of the Indians, except father, who was so much overcome with his situation, so much exhausted by anxiety and grief, that silent despair seemed fastened upon his countenance, and he could not be prevailed upon to refresh his sinking nature by the use of a morsel of food. Our repast being finished, we again resumed our march; and before noon passed a small fort, that I heard my father say was called Fort Canagojigge.

That was the only time that I heard him speak from the time we were taken till we were finally separated the following night.

Toward evening, we arrived at the border of a dark and dismal swamp, which was covered with small hemlocks or some other evergreen, and various kinds of bushes, into which we were conducted; and having gone a short distance, we stopped to encamp for the night.

Here we had some bread and meat for supper; but the dreariness of our situation, together with the uncertainty under which we all labored, as to our future destiny, almost deprived us of the sense of hunger, and destroyed our relish for food.

As soon as I had finished my supper, an Indian took off my shoes and stockings, and put a pair of moccasins on my feet, which my mother observed; and believing that they would spare my life, even if they should destroy the other captives, addressed me, as near as I can remember, in the following words:

'My dear little Mary, I fear that the time has arrived when we must be parted for ever. Your life, my child, I think will be spared; but we shall probably be tomahawked here in this lonesome place by the Indians. Oh! how can I part with you, my darling? What will become of my sweet little Mary? Oh! how can I think of your being continued in captivity, without a hope of your being rescued? Oh! that death had snatched you from my embraces in your infancy: the pain of parting then would have been pleasing to what It now is; and I should have seen the end of your troubles! Alas, my dear! my heart bleeds at the thought of what awaits you; but, if you leave us, remember, my child, your own name, and the names of your father and mother. Be careful and not forget your English tongue. If you shall have an opportunity to get away from the Indians don't try to escape; for if you do they will find and destroy you. Don't forget, my little daughter, the prayers that I have learned you - say them often: be a good child, and God will bless you! May God bless you, my child, and make you comfortable and happy.'

During this time, the Indians stripped the shoes and stockings from the little boy that belonged to the woman who was taken with us, and put moccasins on his feet, as they had done before on mine. I was crying. An Indian took the little boy and myself by the hand, to lead us off from the company, when my mother exclaimed, 'Don't cry, Mary! - don't cry, my child! God will bless you! Farewell - farewell!'

The Indian led us some distance into the bushes or woods, and there lay down with us to spend the night. The recollection of parting with my tender mother kept me awake, while the tears constantly flowed from my eyes. A number of times in the night, the little boy begged of me earnestly to run away with him, and get clear of the Indians; but remembering the advice I had so lately received, and knowing the dangers to which we should be exposed, in traveling without a path and without a guide, through a wilderness unknown to us, I told him that I would not go, and persuaded him to lie still till morning.

My suspicion as to the fate of my parents proved too true; for soon after I left them they were viciously tomahawked to death and scalped, together with Robert, Matthew, Betsey, and the woman and her two children, and mangled in the most shocking manner

After a hard day's march we encamped in a thicket, where the Indians made a shelter of boughs, and then built a good fire to warm and dry our benumbed limbs and clothing; for it had rained some through the day. Here we were again fed as before. When the Indians had finished their supper, they took from their baggage a number of scalps, and went about preparing them for the market, or to keep without spoiling, by straining them over small hoops which they prepared for that purpose, and then drying and scraping them by the fire.

Having put the scalps, yet wet and bloody, upon the hoops, and stretched them to their full extent, they held them to the fire till they were partly dried, and then, with their knives, commenced scraping off the flesh; and in that way they continued to work, alternately drying and scraping them, till they were dry and clean. That being done, they combed the hair in the neatest manner, and then painted it and the edges of the scalps, yet on the hoops, red. Those scalps I knew at the time must have been taken from our poor family, by the color of the hair. My mother's hair was red; and I could easily distinguish my father's and the children's and babies from each other. That sight was most appalling and horrifying; yet I was obliged to endure it without complaining. In the course of the night, they made me to understand that they should not have killed the family, if the whites had not pursued them."

Legacy and honors 

In 1874, at the request of her descendants, Jemison's remains were transferred and reinterred near the 1765 Seneca Council House, which had been moved from the former Caneadea Reservation. The building had been purchased by William Pryor Letchworth and relocated to his Glen Iris Estate. He had the structure restored in 1872 by John Shanks, a Seneca grandson of Jemison. Letchworth invited Seneca and state officials that year for a rededication of the Council House. In 1881, Letchworth acquired a cabin formerly belonging to Mary's daughter, Nancy Jemison. He had it moved from Gardeau Flats to near the Council House and Mary's gravesite. In 1906 he bequeathed his entire estate to New York. Near the present-day town of Castile, today the property is within the grounds of Letchworth State Park.
A bronze statue of Mary Jemison, created in 1910 by Henry Kirke Bush-Brown, marks her grave. Following state restoration of the grounds to Letchworth's time, in 2006 the memorial was reinstalled between the council house and cabin. Dr. George Frederick Kunz helped pay for and commission the 1910 memorial to Jemison.

In popular culture 
 Indian Captive: The Story of Mary Jemison (1941) is a fictional version of Jemison's story for all readers, written and illustrated by Lois Lenski. In this novel, Jemison is given the name: "Little Woman of Great Courage." by her willingness to give up the life of a white woman to become an Indian woman at the end of the book. Before, her name in the novel was Corn Tassel because her hair was the color of the tassels on ripe corn.
Rayna M. Gangi's novel, Mary Jemison: White Woman of the Seneca (1996), is a fictional version of Jemison's story.
 Deborah Larsen's novel, The White (2002), is a fictional version of Jemison's life. It imagines her process of assimilation to the Seneca culture in which she lived.
 Jeanne LeMonnier Gardner's book, "Mary Jemison: Indian Captive" (Original title: "Mary Jemison: Seneca Captive") 1966, is a fictionalized account for children.

See also

Herman Lehmann
Olive Oatman
Mary Ann Oatman
Frances Slocum

References

Further reading 

James, Edward et al. (1971) "Notable American Women: 1607–1950",  URL link
Larsen, Deborah (2002). The White. New York: Alfred A. Knopf, a Division of Random House.
Namias, June (2000) " Jemison, Mary" URL link
Namias, June (1993). White Captives: Gender and Ethnicity on the American Frontier. Chapel Hill: University of North Carolina Press. 
Seaver, James (1824). A Narrative of the Life of Mrs. Mary Jemison. New York: American Scenic & Historical Preservation Society. 1942 edition.

External links 

Sources
Swarthmore College, Mary Jemison, Partial text of a Captivity Narrative from the 1750s transcribed in 1824
A Narrative of the Life of Mrs. Mary Jemison, by James E. Seaver, via Project Gutenberg (plain text)
A Narrative of the Life of Mrs. Mary Jemison, via Internet Archive (scanned books, color illustrated)
A Narrative of the Life of Mrs. Mary Jemison, via Google Books (scanned books)

Other
Letchworth State Park, Glimpses of the Past
"Mary Jemison", Women in American History (Britannica)
Drawing of Mary as an old woman, Letchworth Park History

1743 births
1833 deaths
People born at sea
American people of Scotch-Irish descent
Captives of Native Americans
People from Adams County, Pennsylvania
People of the Province of New York
People of colonial Pennsylvania
People of Pennsylvania in the French and Indian War
Seneca people